Macrocheles montivagus is a species of mite in the family Macrochelidae.

References

montivagus
Articles created by Qbugbot
Animals described in 1887